Events in the year 1943 in Japan.

Incumbents
Emperor: Hirohito
Prime Minister: Hideki Tōjō

Governors
Aichi Prefecture: Yukisawa Chiyoji (until 1 July); Shinji Yoshino (starting 1 July)
Akita Prefecture: Fumi (until 1 January); Katsumi Osafune (starting 1 July)
Aomori Prefecture: Shunsuke Yamada (until 31 March); Utsunomiya Kohei (starting 31 March)
Ehime Prefecture: Ryuichi Fukumoto (until 1 July); Aikawa Katsuroku (starting 1 July)
Fukui Prefecture: Nagano Wakamatsu (until 16 July); Hatsuo Kato (starting 16 July)
Fukushima Prefecture: Yoshio Araki (until 30 June); Koichi Kameyama (starting 1 July)
Gifu Prefecture: Miyoshi Shigeo
Gunma Prefecture: Goro Murata (until 22 April); Shinoyama Chiyuki (starting 22 April)
Hiroshima Prefecture: Saiichiro Miyamura (until 1 July); Sukenari Yokoyama (starting 1 July)
Ibaraki Prefecture: Tsujiyama (until 1 July); Sieve Yoshimi (starting 1 July)
Iwate Prefecture: Osamuzo Suzuki
Kagawa Prefecture: Yoshiji Kosuga
Kochi Prefecture: Naoaki Hattori (until 1 July); Saburo Takahashi (starting 1 July)
Kumamoto Prefecture: Hikari Akira
Kyoto Prefecture: Ando Kyoushirou (until August); Chiyoji Yukizawa (starting August)
Mie Prefecture: Yoshiro Nakano (until 1 July); Yoshio Mochinaga (starting 1 July)
Miyagi Prefecture: Otomaru Kato (until 1 July); Nobuya Uchida (starting 1 July)
Miyazaki Prefecture: Osafume Katsumi (until 1 July); Tadao Nishihiro (starting 1 July)
Nagano Prefecture: Nagoya Osamu (until 10 January); Yoshio Koriyama (starting 10 January)
Niigata Prefecture: Doi Shohei (until 1 February); Maeda Tamon (starting 1 February)
Oita Prefecture: Ito Hisamatsu (until 1 May) 
Okinawa Prefecture: Hajime Hayakawa (until 1 July); Osamu Mori Izumi (starting 1 July)
Saga Prefecture: 
Saitama Prefecture: Toshio Otsu (until 1 July); Sudo Tetsushin (starting 1 July)
Shiname Prefecture: Goro Koizumi (until 10 October); Takeo Yamada (starting 10 October)
Tochigi Prefecture: Soma Toshio
Tokyo: Matsumura Miro (until 1 July); Shigeo Daitachi (starting 1 July)
Toyama Prefecture: Kingo Machimura (until 23 April); Saka Shinya (starting 23 April)
Yamagata Prefecture: Akira Saito

Events
January 14 – February 7 – Operation Ke
January 29–30 – Battle of Rennell Island
January 29–31 – Battle of Wau
March 2–4 – Battle of the Bismarck Sea
March 27 – Battle of the Komandorski Islands
May 11–30 – Battle of Attu
June 28 – July 1 – Battle of Viru Harbor
June 30 – July 3 – Battle of Wickham Anchorage
July 6 – Battle of Kula Gulf
July 10–11 – Battle of Enogai
July 12/13 – Battle of Kolombangara
July 20 – Battle of Bairoko
July 22 – August 4 – Battle of Munda Point
August 6–7 – Battle of Vella Gulf
August 17–18 – Battle off Horaniu
September 10 – 1943 Tottori earthquake
October 27 – November 12 – Battle of the Treasury Islands
November 7–8 – Battle of Koromokina Lagoon
November 18–25 – Battle of Piva Forks
November 20–23 – Battle of Tarawa
November 20–23 – Battle of Makin

Films
Sanshiro Sugata
Momotarō no Umiwashi

Births

January 7 – Sadako Sasaki, hibakusha (d. 1955)
January 15 – Kirin Kiki, actress (d. 2018)
January 19 – Haruo Yasuda, golfer
February 20 – Antonio Inoki, wrestler
February 22 – Otoya Yamaguchi, assassin (d. 1960)
April 3 – Hikaru Saeki, Japanese admiral, the first female star officer of the Japan Self-Defense Forces
April 5 – Fighting Harada, boxer (real name Masahiko Harada)
May 4 – Michiyo Azusa, singer and actress (real name Michiyo Hayashi) (d. 2020)
June 20 – Masayuki Uemura, engineer and video game producer (d. 2021)
August 17 – Yukio Kasaya, ski jumper
September 16 – Tadamasa Goto, Japanese yakuza boss
November 20 – Mie Hama, actress
December 2 – Kiwako Taichi, actress (d. 1992)
December 11 – Mariko Kaga, actress

Deaths
June 9- Mie Dong Long,film maker
February 4 – Senjūrō Hayashi, Prime Minister of Japan (b. 1876)
March 19 – Fujishima Takeji, painter (b. 1867)
April 18 – Isoroku Yamamoto, admiral (b. 1884)
May 29 – Yasuyo Yamasaki, army officer (b. 1891)
June 11 – Heisuke Abe, general (b. 1886)
July 6 – Teruo Akiyama, admiral (b. 1891)
July 12/13 – Shunji Isaki, admiral (b. 1892)
July 18 – Miyake Kaho, novelist, essayist and poet (b. 1868)
August 21 – Hirohide Fushimi, lieutenant Commander (b. 1912)
August 22 – Tōson Shimazaki, author (b. 1872)
September 10 – Takeshi Sakurada, lieutenant general (b. 1891)
October 16 – Yanagihara Naruko, lady-in-waiting and concubine (b. 1859)
October 17 –Denji Kuroshima, author (b. 1898)
November 20 – Keiji Shibazaki, Rear Admiral (b. 1894)

See also
 List of Japanese films of the 1940s

References

 
1940s in Japan
Japan
Years of the 20th century in Japan